Hung Far Low is the fifth and final studio album by noise rock band The Honeymoon Killers, released in 1991 by Fist Puppet Records.

Release and reception 

Todd Kristel of AllMusic criticized the record for feeling too mechanical and lacking entertainment value, concluding that "it is listenable and occasionally even interesting."

Track listing

Personnel 
Adapted from the Hung Far Low liner notes.

The Honeymoon Killers
 Russell Simins – drums, bongos, vocals
 Jon Spencer – guitar, trombone
 Jerry Teel – guitar, harmonica, vocals
 Lisa Wells – bass guitar, vocals

Production and additional personnel
 Marcellus Hall – harmonica (10)
 The Honeymoon Killers – production
 Jens Jurgenson – photography

Release history

References

External links 
 

1991 albums
The Honeymoon Killers (American band) albums